Messenger in the Camp is a mini-album by British band Seafood. Released in 1998, the album collects together the band's first three singles, their accompanying b-sides and two radio session tracks recorded in the Xfm London station studios.

Track listing
All songs written by Seafood.

"Scorch Comfort" – 4:01
"Psychic Rainy Nights" – 5:22
"Porchlight" – 4:33
"Ukiah" – 3:07
"Rot Of The Stars (Xfm session)" – 4:00
"Dope Slax (Xfm session)" – 4:48
"We Felt Maroon" – 2:58
"Dig" – 6:16

Personnel
David Line - Vocals, guitars
Charles MacLeod - Guitars
Kevin Hendrick - Bass, vocals
Caroline Banks - Drums, vocals

References

1998 albums
Seafood (band) albums
Fierce Panda Records albums